The 1950 Florida State Seminoles football team represented Florida State University as a member of the Dixie Conference during the 1950 college football season. Led by third-year head coach Don Veller, the Seminoles compiled an overall record of 8–0 with a mark of 4–0 in conference play, winning the Dixie Conference title for the third consecutive season. It was the first undefeated season for the program.

Schedule

References

Florida State
Florida State Seminoles football seasons
College football undefeated seasons
Florida State Seminoles football